"Happenings Ten Years Time Ago" is a song by the English group the Yardbirds. Written and recorded in 1966, it is considered one of their most progressive works. The song was the group's first to feature the dual-lead guitar line-up of Jeff Beck and Jimmy Page. The two contribute an array of guitar parts during the instrumental sections, described as "a full-on six-string apocalypse". Lyrically, it deals with notions of past life and déjà vu.

The song was released as a single to mixed reviews and was less successful on the record charts than the group's previous efforts.  More recently, it has been acknowledged for its inventiveness and contribution to the early development of psychedelic music.  Several elements have influenced songs by other musicians.

Background
"Happenings Ten Years Time Ago" came about in the period after Yardbirds' founding member and bassist, Paul Samwell-Smith, left the group to pursue record production full-time. In June 1966, he was replaced by studio guitarist Jimmy Page, who agreed to serve as bassist until rhythm guitarist Chris Dreja gained some proficiency on the instrument. The Yardbirds maintained a heavy schedule of live appearances that coincided with the release of their latest single, "Over Under Sideways Down".  Page recalls that he had become stifled with studio work and by playing live with the Yardbirds, even though on bass, he was able to come up with new ideas when he returned to the guitar.

During their American tour in August and September, the Yardbirds' lead guitarist Jeff Beck experienced health and personal issues. For the shows that he missed, Page took over on lead, while Dreja switched to bass. When the group returned to the UK, Beck and Page became co-lead guitarists, with Dreja as the full-time bassist.  With the line-up change also came a shift in musical styles. The group had already gone through one change, when they moved beyond the repertoire of older American blues and R&B songs then in fashion among the early beat and British rhythm and blues groups (and prompting guitarist Eric Clapton to leave the group).  With two lead guitarists in the group, the Yardbirds explored a different approach.  Rather than trading solos while the other played rhythm guitar, Page explains:

Beck's and Page's guitar interplay also resulted in the music getting "heavier", as heard in parts of "Beck's Bolero", the instrumental recorded by the two five months earlier for a Beck solo project. Between 23 September and 9 October, the new configuration toured Britain with the Rolling Stones for a dozen shows. During this time, the Yardbirds also recorded "Happenings Ten Years Time Ago" and were filmed performing an updated version of "The Train Kept A-Rollin, titled "Stroll On", for their appearance in Michelangelo Antonioni's film Blowup (1966).

Composition

After Samwell-Smith's departure, Yardbirds' singer Keith Relf and drummer Jim McCarty spent more time together and began exploring shared interests in popular mysticism and reincarnation. While the two were at Relf's home, they started with an idea for a song with a theme of "being reborn, living before" and déjà vu.  Relf's lyrics, as heard in the finished recording, include: "It seems to me I've been here before, the sounds I heard and the sights I saw, was it real or was it in my dreams, I need to know what it all means".

Later, Page became involved in the recording studio:

In another interview, Page explained that some of the material he contributed to the Yardbirds was actually developed while he was still a studio guitarist and asserts that "Happenings Ten Years Time Ago" was "basically my thing".

"Happenings Ten Years Time Ago" is composed of four main sections: vocal verses with the main rhythmic accompaniment, chorus, an instrumental middle, and an instrumental closing. Musical notation shows the key of E minor, with a moderate tempo of 127 beats per minute in 4/4 or common time. The song begins with a four-bar instrumental opening, then settles into the main rhythm, which music educator William Echard describes as "distorted punctuating chords, a repeated descending chromatic line, and drums with strong accents on every [quarter note] beat", along with electric bass.  The accompaniment continues through Relf's first verses, then transitions to a  Gregorian chant-inspired interlude. McCarty adds a harmony to Relf's vocal while single guitar chords are played, which suggest "tones of the ritualistic, epic, and ancient" (Echard). This soon gives way to the chorus, which includes repeating two-note figures on guitar, that "underscores the ominous, tense mood" (Echard).

After cycling through more verse and chorus sections, the first instrumental section begins. Group chronicler Greg Russo describes that it "took off on an astounding tangent, with Page's guitar imitating a police siren before guitar explosions and a searing Beck solo worked around Jeff's Cockney-influenced recitation". However, Guitar Worlds Alan Di Perna attributes the mock siren to Beck: "An ominous European-style police siren—courtesy of Beck's guitar—leads the way into a full-on six-string apocalypse with atomic bomb blasts and shards of scarified riffing." The multiple overdubbed guitar solos are played by both Beck and Page, or by Beck with Page on rhythm guitar, and "sounded like duelling fighter planes", according to journalist Bob Stanley.

During the recording sessions, Beck provided some humour by imitating comments made by an attendant who examined members of the group at a specialty health clinic.  Although Beck's recitation is broken up and unclear under the guitar solos, McCarty describes it as a "note-perfect impersonation... We fell about laughing and of course it had to stay on the record."  After another verse and chorus, there is an instrumental closing section "which intensifies the chaotic, sinister tone of the song" that begins with droning feedback on the bass strings of the guitar, and includes multiple guitar lines over the main rhythmic accompaniment, before ending with a quick fade-out.

Recording
"Happenings Ten Years Time Ago" was recorded in London during breaks in the Yardbirds touring schedule. According to McCarty, it began when he, Relf, and Page went into a recording studio to develop some new material. Page brought along fellow studio musician John Paul Jones to provide the bass, since Dreja had yet to fully adapt to the instrument. The four proceeded to jam on some chords and lyrics and the song started to take form.  However, there is some disagreement on the location and date for recording the basic song or backing track:
McCarty identifies the IBC Studios in London, but does not give a date.
Beck biographer Martin Power places an IBC session at the beginning of August 1966 (the group left for an American tour on 3 August).
Russo indicates a basic track recording session at De Lane Lea Studios in London on 26 July.
Group biographer Alan Clayson lists the 26 July IBC session as "likely cancelled" and that the basic track was recorded at De Lane Lea on 20 September.
However, there is agreement for various overdubs made between 20 September and 2 October at De Lane Lea; Beck, who had been unavailable for the earlier sessions, recorded several guitar parts and his spoken passage during this time. The recording was engineered by Dave Siddle and the audio mixing was completed by about 3 October.

Releases and charts
In the UK, "Happenings Ten Years Time Ago" was released as a single by the Columbia Graphophone Company on 21 October 1966.  "Psycho Daisies", a new song recorded during the same sessions, was used for the B-side.  It is based on the 1959 Eddie Cochran song "Somethin' Else" and Beck provides the guitar and vocal, with Page on bass, and McCarty on drums.  The single peaked at  during a five week appearance on the Record Retailer singles chart. On 4 November, Epic Records issued the single in the US, which 
was coupled with another vocal by Beck, "The Nazz Are Blue", taken from the Yardbirds' 1966 self-titled album (also known as Roger the Engineer (UK) and Over Under Sideways Down (US)).  There, it was more successful, 
reaching  on the Billboard Hot 100 chart, during a stay of nine weeks. In Canada, the single reached .

The song made its first album appearance in April 1967 on the Epic anthology The Yardbirds Greatest Hits. It was followed in October by the Capitol Canada compilation, The Hits of the Yardbirds, which also includes the song. Because of cross licensing problems, most subsequent anthologies and retrospective Yardbirds albums are limited to pre-Roger the Engineer/Over Under Sideways Down recordings (before April 1966). However, it is included on the 1983 Epic expanded reissue of the 1966 UK album Yardbirds (Roger the Engineer); Beckology, the 1991 Epic/Legacy boxed set featuring Jeff Beck; and Ultimate!, the 2001 comprehensive Yardbirds retrospective by Rhino Entertainment.

The first singles and albums often have errors or are incomplete in listing the songwriters:
Columbia single (UK): "Yardbirds" (no individual songwriters)
Epic single (US): "C. Drega, K. Relf, P. Samwell-Smith, J. McCarthy, J. Beck"
Epic album (US): "K. Relf, J. McCarthy, G. Beck, J. Page"
Capitol single (Canada): "Dreja, McCarty, Beck, Samwell-Smith"
Capitol album (Canada): "Relf, Dreja, McCarty, Beck, Page"
For the 1966 US copyright filing, the songwriters are shown as "Keith Relf, James McCarty, Jeff Beck & Jimmy Page". This reflects the four group members who participated in the recording and is consistent with statements by the three survivors. These four also appear in the songwriter credits for Beckology and Ultimate!.

Broadcast and concert performances
Two days before Columbia issued the single, the Yardbirds were filmed performing "Happenings Ten Years Time Ago" for BBC Television. It was broadcast on the music variety programme Top of the Pops on 17 November 1966.  McCarty recalls that he and Dreja produced a short film, which he describes as "a precursor to the modern pop video", prior to departing for another US tour.  It was delivered to the show's producer, with the expectation that it would be aired during their absence from the UK. However, a second performance of the song on Top of the Pops was never broadcast, and McCarty believes that it "disappeared into the bowels of BBC, never to be seen again".

After a concert performance at the Fillmore in San Francisco on 23 October, the group were filmed miming to "Happenings Ten Years Time Ago" for television. It was the first appearance by a rock group on a programme hosted by veteran comedian Milton Berle, who preceded their performance with "An ancient English philosopher once said... if you want to add wild sounds to your shows, let the yardbirds of paradise fly up your nose".  It was broadcast on 2 December and biographer David French writes: "Unfortunately, the band did not look very enthusiastic miming to the record and bad psychedelic effects marred the entire appearance."

In concert, "Happenings Ten Years Time Ago" was performed by the dual lead guitar line-up, until Beck left the group at the end of October 1966. The Yardbirds continued to tour as a four piece into 1968, with all the guitar parts played by Page. A performance on 15 March 1967 was filmed for West German television and the audio is included on the semi-official Cumular Limit (2000) and Glimpses 1963–1968 (2011) compilation albums.

Critical reception

Contemporary reviews
When "Happenings Ten Years Time Ago" was released in 1966, critical rock journalism was limited to a small number of publications. The Yardbirds' "Shapes of Things", released in February 1966, became the first song by a group in Britain to be described as "psychedelic".  However, the term soon became overused and "the Yardbirds had been caught up in an English backlash against the emerging drug culture" (French). A review by Penny Valentine for the UK weekly Disc and Music Echo was harsh:

In the US, the reaction was markedly different. The song received a favourable review in Billboard magazine's "Pop Spotlights" column: "Infectious driving beat and unusual arrangement combined with an off-beat lyric content makes this hot contender for a fast chart climber." In a record column for KRLA Beat magazine, Eden distinguished between "psychedelic" and "commercialized electronic noise" and wrote:

Retrospective assessments
In a song review for AllMusic, Matthew Greenwald describes "Happenings Ten Years Time Ago" as "One of the greatest, lost singles from the 1966/1967 era... this very progressive record was somewhat lost in the shuffle." He adds:

Music historian Bob Gulla effuses in Guitar Gods: The 25 Players Who Made Rock History, "a towering masterpiece of psychedelic pop; [it] occupies the pinnacle of the entire psychedelic genre". In a similar vein, biographer Martin Power comments: "If the Yardbirds had invented or at least contributed heavily to the birth of psychedelic music in their past, they had come to define it with 'Happenings Ten Years Time Ago'."

In his book 1966: The Year the Decade Exploded, Jon Savage writes:
"It was a compressed pop-art explosion, with a ferocious staccato guitar figure, a massive descending riff and rolling instrumental break and LSD-inspired lyrics that questioned the construction of reality and the nature of time."
He adds that such experimentalism came at a cost: "The musicians were seen as overreaching themselves; they had lost an influential reviewer [Valentine] and were in danger of losing their audience." However, author Frank Hoffman sees it as following "Shapes of Things" in "enabl[ing] the Yardbirds to remain commercially viable despite a pronounced experimental orientation". Music writer Keith Shadwick feels it was their last single that showed them to be ahead of the curve.

In When Giants Walked the Earth, author Mick Wall comments on the forward-looking aspects of the song: "This was more than simple pop psychedelia.  This was ground zero for seventies rock.  Hypnotically interweaving, Eastern-influenced guitars, weapons-grade rhythms." Other writers also describe it as pointing the way towards heavy metal: "soar[ing] into a unique psychedelic/metal mode" (Eder); and "presages the hard rock and heavy metal sounds of the 1970s and 1980s" (Stuessy, Lipscomb). Far Out magazine contributor Arun Starkey writes in a 9 January 2022 article "Jimmy Page's 10 best songs with and without Led Zeppelin":

Legacy

"Happenings Ten Years Time Ago" appears at number three on Record Collectors chronological list of the "100 Greatest Psychedelic Records". Elements of the song have influenced or inspired several other artists. Pink Floyd biographer Julian Palacios writes that Syd Barrett "assimilates" the instrumental section for "Candy and a Currant Bun".  French identifies Love's "A House Is Not a Motel" (parts of the solos played by two guitars) and the uptempo part of the Stooges' "I'm Sick of You" (the main riff). Guitarist Mark Arm of Mudhoney explained its influence on "Touch Me I'm Sick": "if you look to the origins of that riff it's actually like the Yardbirds' 'Happenings Ten Years Time Ago' and/or the fast part of the Stooges' 'I'm Sick of You'."

When Jimi Hendrix first met Beck in London in 1966, he asked him how he got the song's feedback sounds.  Beck recalls that Hendrix told him, "You know that lick you did on 'Happenings Ten Years Time Ago'? I swiped that."  Di Perna writes:

In the late 1960s, prior to joining Big Star, Chris Bell performed "Happenings Ten Years Time Ago" in concert. To approximate Beck's sound going into the instrumental middle section, a pre-recorded slowed-down sound of an explosion was used as Bell went into his guitar solo.  Daryl Easlea writes in his biography of the American rock duo Sparks: "It [the song] was three minutes of surreal, psychedelic aural imagery. [The Mael brothers] Ron and Russell would listen to it and marvel at its wonder and it was to become something of a touchstone for their early work." Todd Rundgren, who produced Sparks' first album, recorded the song for his album Faithful (1976). In an album review, Stephen Thomas Erlewine calls it a "re-creation, with Rundgren 'faithfully' replicating the sound and feel of the Yardbirds [original]".

Personnel 
Musicians
Keith Relf – vocals
Jeff Beck – guitar
Jimmy Page – guitar
John Paul Jones – bass
Jim McCarty – drums, backing vocals

Production
Simon Napier-Bell – producer
Dave Siddle – recording engineer

Footnotes

References

Bibliography

External links

1966 songs
1966 singles
The Yardbirds songs
Songs written by Jeff Beck
Songs written by Jimmy Page
Songs written by Keith Relf
Songs written by Jim McCarty
Columbia Graphophone Company singles
Epic Records singles